This is a list of episodes for The Colbert Report in 2009.

2009

January

February

March

April

May

June

July

August

September

October

November

December

References

External links

 
 

2009
2009 American television seasons